Syed Muhammad Imran Majeed HI(M) (born 1961) is retired surgeon general of the Pakistani Army. He was a consultant cardiologist and cardiac electrophysiologist at the Armed Forces Institute of Cardiology between 2015 and 2016. He retired in 2019 from the Pakistan Army. He served as Vice Chancellor of the NUMS from 2 July 2016 - 19 January 2022.

Early life and education
Imran was born in Sialkot in 1961 to a middle-class family. He attended Cadet College Hasan Abdal, left King Edward Medical University (KEMU) and graduated from the first batch of the Army Medical College with a Bachelor of Medicine and Bachelor of Surgery (MBBS) in 1982. He received fellowship of the College of Physicians and Surgeons Pakistan. Imran received his specialty in cardiology.

Military career
After joining the Pakistan Army, Imran quickly climbed in rank as he excelled at various assignments. In 2012 he was promoted to Major General, and was made commandant of Armed Forces Institute of Cardiology

Imran is among the founders of the National University of Medical Sciences. In 2015, Imran was awarded the second-highest military award, the Hilal-i-Imtiaz–Military. That same year, he was promoted to Lieutenant General. In 2015, he was made the Surgeon General of the Pakistani Army and was promoted to Colonel Commandant of the Pakistan Army Medical Corps.

References

External links
Pakistan Army (Official website)

1962 births
B
Pakistani military doctors
King Edward Medical University alumni
Pakistani cardiologists
People from Sialkot District
People from Punjab, Pakistan
Recipients of Hilal-i-Imtiaz
Living people